Pingara is a 2020 Indian Tulu language film directed by Preetham Shetty. The film was released in film festivals.

Cast 
Neema Ray as Malli
Sharan Shetty
Usha Bandari as Dodda
Guruprasad Hegde as Mahabala
Chaitanya Chandramohan as Sinchana

Reception 
A critic from The News Minute opined that "Overall, Pingara is a good attempt at making a socially conscious film".

Awards
67th National Film Awards — Best Feature Film in Tulu
Bengaluru International Film Festival - International Jury Award
Network for the Promotion of Asian Cinema - International Judges Award

References

Tulu-language films
Indian drama films
2020 films
National Film Award (India) winners